First Baptist Church, East Thomas is a historic church at 419 11th Court West in Birmingham, Alabama.  It was built in 1939 in a Gothic Revival style and was added to the National Register of Historic Places in 2005.

References

Baptist churches in Alabama
Churches on the National Register of Historic Places in Alabama
National Register of Historic Places in Birmingham, Alabama
Gothic Revival church buildings in Alabama
Churches completed in 1939
Baptist churches in Birmingham, Alabama
1939 establishments in Alabama